We Couldn't Think of a Title is the debut studio album by American comedy metal band Psychostick. It features Psychostick's brand of metal/hardcore mixed with humor, with some of the tracks being comedy skits or transitions to other songs, like Death Burger, Indecision (which is a recurring skit throughout the album), and Good Morning. Originally self-released on May 16, 2003.  This album also contains their most successful track, "BEER!!!".

"We Couldn't Think of a Title" reached #41 on the Billboard's Top Heatseekers, #4 on the Billboard's Top Heatseeker's (West North Central), and #48 on the Top Independent Albums.

Track listing

B-sides
 "Hokey Fuckin' Pokey" — 3:42 (B-side released by the band through BitTorrent)
 "Those Stupid Ifs" - 5:17 (B-side released by the band through BitTorrent)

Alternate releases
A version with all of the skits and short songs removed from the album is sold on iTunes

Personnel
Psychostick
 Robert "The Notorious R.O.B." Kersey (Lead vocals)
 Joshua "Special J" Key (Lead and rhythm guitar, backing vocals)
 Mike "Hawkizzard" Kocian (Bass guitar, backing vocals)
 Alex "The Boy" Preiss (Drums and percussion, bird noises) co-lead vocals (16)
 Guest Appearances:
 "BEER!" – Brian Navarro (answering beer part), Crack Money Records, Biomech, Detox, Digital E, Halfgain, Makeshift, Headcreep, This, The Washingtons, and Wisdom of Eternity.
 "Throwin' Down" – Lindsey Hans
 "Orgasm = Love" – Becky Williams
 "Fake My Own Death and Go Platinum" – Shannon Siggins and Becky Williams
 "Lizard Sphere X" – Big Daddy Crack and Double Dee
 "Jagermeister Love Song" – Vince "V" Johansen
 All songs written and performed by Psychostick
 Drums Recorded by Scott Seymann at Headpop Studios
 Guitars and Bass Recorded at Joshy Apartment Studios
 Vocals Recorded at Robby's Crappy Yet Effective Vocal Booth
 Produced by Joshua Key and Psychostick
 Mixed and Engineered by Joshua Key
 Mastered by Dave Shirk at Sonorus Mastering Inc.
 Kickdrum Triggering by Ted Preiss
 Artwork by Robert "Rawrb" Kersey
 "The Dumb" street team led by Tony Schiavo and Alex Preiss

Chart performance

Trivia
Psychostick's musical influences are mentioned during a skit following the song 'Pluh' (but within the same track on the album), in which the band continues discussing potential album names for their release. For example, one band-member suggests naming the album 'Destroy Erase Chaosphere,' which references two of Meshuggah's studio albums. Other musical acts mentioned are Pantera and Sevendust.

References

2003 debut albums
Psychostick albums
Rock Ridge Music albums